Sami Fatha  [سامي فضة in Arabic] (born 10 March 1989) is a Saudi football goalkeeper who plays for Al-Jubail as a goalkeeper.

External links 
 

1989 births
Living people
Saudi Arabian footballers
Al-Wehda Club (Mecca) players
Jeddah Club players
Damac FC players
Al-Jubail Club players
Khaleej FC players
Al-Kawkab FC players
Saudi First Division League players
Saudi Professional League players
Saudi Second Division players
Saudi Third Division players
Sportspeople from Mecca
Association football goalkeepers